Janaprith Salinda Fernando (Sinhala: ජනප්‍රිත් සාලින්ද ප්‍රනාන්දු;  September 23, 1967 in Ratmalana) of Colombo, Sri Lanka, the Colombo Law Society President, serves as the Chief Commissioner of the Sri Lanka Scout Association and an elected volunteer member of the Asia-Pacific Regional Scout Committee of the World Organization of the Scout Movement (WOSM) from 2012 to 2018.He is currently serving in the World Scout Committee, the World Organisation of the Scout Movement's highest governing body. Fernando was elected to this body in August 2017 by the 41st World Scout Conference, held in Baku, Azerbaijan.

Fernando graduated from S. Thomas' College, Mount Lavinia, studied at Sri Lanka Law College where he was the President of the Law Students' Union in 1990, and is practicing as an attorney.

Scouting life
Janaprith Fernando began his Scouting Career in 1979 as a Scout at 39th Colombo Scout Troop, St. Thomas’ Prep School, Kollupitiya and qualified for the highest Scout Award, President's Scout. He is an old boy of S. Thomas’ Preparatory School, Kollupitiya and S. Thomas’ College, Mount Lavinia. At school, he was an all-rounder who excelled in both studies and extra-curricular activities. He was the Scout Leader of 39th Colombo Scout Troop for over 10 years until taking up leadership roles in the Colombo District in 1994. He has received the Medal for distinguished service 2011 and Scout Service Medal from the Prime Minister of Malaysia 2013, The Green Jade Lion medal from the President of the Republic of Taiwan 2014, Bronze Tamaraw Award from the Vice President of the Republic of Philippines 2014, Association of Top Achiever Scouts Medallion from Regional Director of the WOSM/APR 2010, International Friendship Award 2012 and Medal of Honour awarded by the Korea Scout Association, Medal of Merit in 2010 and Bar to the Medal of Merit in 2013 by the President of Sri Lanka, President's Scout Award in 1984 and the Wood Badge Award in 1989. After his Scouting days he qualified as a Scout Leader, Assistant District Commissioner and finally as the District Scout Commissioner of the Colombo District. After completing his period as District Commissioner Janaprith was invited to join the National Headquarters as a Special Commissioner and was later appointed International Commissioner. In 2009 Janaprith was appointed as the Chairman of the Management Sub Committee of the Asia Pacific Scout Region. In 2012, Janaprith became the first Sri Lankan to be elected to the Asia Pacific Regional Scout Committee which he serves. Janaprith currently is the Chairman of the Global Support Team of the World Organization of the Scout Movement. He was also the Deputy Chief Commissioner of the Sri Lanka Scout Association in October 2016 and is currently serving in this post. The International Commissioner of Sri Lanka Scout Association, Janaprith Fernando, Attorney-at-Law assumed duties as the newly appointed Deputy Chief Commissioner in 2016, in the presence of the Chief Commissioner Professor Nimal de Silva and a distinguished gathering. Thereafter, he was elected to the World Scout Committee on the 17th of August 2017 in which he will serve till 2020.

References

1967 births
Alumni of Sri Lanka Law College
Alumni of S. Thomas' College, Mount Lavinia
Living people
People from Colombo
Scouting and Guiding in Sri Lanka
World Scout Committee members